Pentanema helenioides is a species of plant in the daisy family Asteraceae. It is native to southern France and north-central and eastern Spain.

References 

 

helenioides
Flora of Europe